The European North Basketball League (ENBL) is regional professional men's club basketball league in northern, central and eastern Europe; it has been organised since 2021. ENBL format is based on the European Youth Basketball league (founded in 1998) – FIBA approved international competition for girls and boys which recently featured around 300 teams from 29 countries.

History 
European North Basketball league (ENBL) has been founded in summer 2021 for professional men's clubs from Northern, Central and Eastern Europe. It's designed for the clubs who wish to compete internationally at a high level.

The first season featured eight teams from Poland, Czech Republic, Lithuania, Latvia, Estonia, Belarus and Russia, including several national medalists with wide regional and international experience.

The second season saw an expansion to 16 teams within two groups. While Belarussian and Russian teams were excluded, teams from Israel, Ukraine and Kosovo joined. A team from Serbia also joined but withdrew at the last moment, meaning the participating teams dropped to 15.

Competition format 
A round robin tournament – at least seven games in three stages (3+2+2), followed by the Final Four in Spring of 2022. There will be no games during FIBA international windows for the National teams (November 22–30, 2021; February 21-March 1, 2022).

Venues and locations

Summary

Titles by club

Titles by country

See also
North European Basketball League

References

External links
Official website

 
Multi-national professional sports leagues
Multi-national basketball leagues in Europe
2021 establishments in Europe
Sports leagues established in 2021